Deserted may refer to:
Desertion, the act of abandoning or withdrawing support from an entity to which one has given. This most commonly refers to a military desertion.
Deserted (film), a 2016 film
"Deserted", a song by Blind Melon from their 1992 album Blind Melon
Deserted, a 2019 album by the Mekons